Naegleriasis (also known as primary amoebic meningoencephalitis; PAM) is an almost invariably fatal infection of the brain by the free-living unicellular eukaryote Naegleria fowleri. Symptoms are meningitis-like and include headache, fever, nausea, vomiting, a stiff neck, confusion, hallucinations and seizures. Symptoms progress rapidly over around five days, and death usually results within one to two weeks of symptoms.

N. fowleri is typically found in warm bodies of fresh water, such as ponds, lakes, rivers and hot springs. It is also found in an amoeboid or temporary flagellate stage in soil, poorly maintained municipal water supplies, water heaters, near warm-water discharges of industrial plants and in poorly chlorinated or unchlorinated swimming pools. There is no evidence of it living in salt water. As the disease is rare, it is often not considered during diagnosis.

Although infection occurs very rarely, it almost inevitably results in death. Of the 450 or so naegleriasis cases in the past 60 years, only seven have survived, for a case fatality rate of 98.5%.

Signs and symptoms
Onset of symptoms begins one to nine days following exposure (with an average of five). Initial symptoms include changes in taste and smell, headache, fever, nausea, vomiting, back pain, and a stiff neck. Secondary symptoms are also meningitis-like including confusion, hallucinations, lack of attention, ataxia, cramp and seizures. After the start of symptoms, the disease progresses rapidly over three to seven days, with death usually occurring anywhere from seven to fourteen days later, although it can take longer. In 2013, a man in Taiwan died 25 days after being infected by Naegleria fowleri.

It affects healthy children or young adults who have recently been exposed to bodies of fresh water. Some people have presented with a clinical triad of edematous brain lesions, immune suppression and fever. Scientists speculate that lower age groups are at a higher risk of contracting the disease because adolescents have a more underdeveloped and porous cribriform plate, through which the amoeba travels to reach the brain.

Cause

N. fowleri invades the central nervous system via the nose, specifically through the olfactory mucosa of the nasal tissues. This usually occurs as the result of the introduction of water that has been contaminated with N. fowleri into the nose during activities such as swimming, bathing or nasal irrigation.

The amoeba follows the olfactory nerve fibers through the cribriform plate of the ethmoid bone into the skull. There, it migrates to the olfactory bulbs and subsequently other regions of the brain, where it feeds on the nerve tissue. The organism then begins to consume cells of the brain, piecemeal through trogocytosis, by means of an amoebostome, a unique actin-rich sucking apparatus extended from its cell surface. It then becomes pathogenic, causing primary amoebic meningoencephalitis (PAM or PAME).

Primary amoebic meningoencephalitis presents symptoms similar to those of bacterial and viral meningitis. Upon abrupt disease onset, a plethora of problems arise. Endogenous cytokines, which release in response to pathogens, affect the hypothalamus' thermoregulatory neurons and cause a rise in body temperature. Additionally, cytokines may act on the vascular organ of the lamina terminalis, leading to the synthesis of prostaglandin (PG) E2 which acts on the hypothalamus, resulting in an increase in body temperature. Also, the release of cytokines and exogenous exotoxins coupled with an increase in intracranial pressure stimulate nociceptors in the meninges creating pain sensations.

The release of cytotoxic molecules in the central nervous system results in extensive tissue damage and necrosis, such as damage to the olfactory nerve through lysis of nerve cells and demyelination. Specifically, the olfactory nerve and bulbs become necrotic and hemorrhagic. Spinal flexion leads to nuchal rigidity, or stiff neck, due to the stretching of the inflamed meninges. The increase in intracranial pressure stimulates the area postrema to create nausea sensations which may lead to brain herniation and damage to the reticular formation. Ultimately, the increase in cerebrospinal fluid from inflammation of the meninges increases intracranial pressure and leads to the destruction of the central nervous system. Although the exact pathophysiology behind the seizures caused by PAM is unknown, scientists speculate that the seizures arise from altered meningeal permeability caused by increased intracranial pressure.

Pathogenesis

Naegleria fowleri propagates in warm, stagnant bodies of fresh water (typically during the summer months), and enters the central nervous system after insufflation of infected water by attaching itself to the olfactory nerve. It then migrates through the cribriform plate and into the olfactory bulbs of the forebrain, where it multiplies itself greatly by feeding on nerve tissue.

Diagnosis
N. fowleri can be grown in several kinds of liquid axenic media or on non-nutrient agar plates coated with bacteria. Escherichia coli can be used to overlay the non-nutrient agar plate and a drop of cerebrospinal fluid sediment is added to it. Plates are then incubated at 37 °C and checked daily for clearing of the agar in thin tracks, which indicate the trophozoites have fed on the bacteria.

Detection in water is performed by centrifuging a water sample with E. coli added, then applying the pellet to a non-nutrient agar plate. After several days, the plate is microscopically inspected and Naegleria cysts are identified by their morphology. Final confirmation of the species' identity can be performed by various molecular or biochemical methods.

Confirmation of Naegleria presence can be done by a so-called flagellation test, where the organism is exposed to a hypotonic environment (distilled water). Naegleria, in contrast to other amoebae, differentiates within two hours into the flagellate state. Pathogenicity can be further confirmed by exposure to high temperature (42 °C): Naegleria fowleri is able to grow at this temperature, but the nonpathogenic Naegleria gruberi is not.

Prevention
Michael Beach, a recreational waterborne illness specialist for the Centers for Disease Control and Prevention, stated in remarks to the Associated Press that wearing of nose clips to prevent insufflation of contaminated water would be effective protection against contracting PAM, noting that "You'd have to have water going way up in your nose to begin with".

Advice stated in the press release from Taiwan's Centers for Disease Control recommended people prevent fresh water from entering the nostrils and avoid putting their heads down into fresh water or stirring mud in the water with feet. When starting to suffer from fever, headache, nausea, or vomiting subsequent to any kind of exposure to fresh water, even in the belief that no fresh water has traveled through the nostrils, people with such conditions should be carried to hospital quickly and make sure doctors are well-informed about the history of exposure to fresh water.

Treatment
On the basis of the laboratory evidence and case reports, heroic doses of amphotericin B have been the traditional mainstay of PAM treatment since the first reported survivor in the United States in 1982.

Treatment has often also used combination therapy with multiple other antimicrobials in addition to amphotericin, such as fluconazole, miconazole, rifampicin and azithromycin. They have shown limited success only when administered early in the course of an infection. Fluconazole is commonly used as it has been shown to have synergistic effects against naegleria when used with amphotericin in vitro.

While the use of rifampicin has been common, including in all four North American cases of survival, its continued use has been questioned. It only has variable activity in vitro and it has strong effects on the therapeutic levels of other antimicrobials used by inducing cytochrome p450 pathways.

In 2013, two successfully treated cases in the United States utilized the medication miltefosine. As of 2015, there was no data on how well miltefosine is able to reach the central nervous system. As of 2015 the U.S. CDC offered miltefosine to doctors for the treatment of free-living amoebas including naegleria. In one of the cases, a 12-year-old female, was given miltefosine and targeted temperature management to manage cerebral edema that is secondary to the infection. She survived with no neurological damage. The targeted temperature management commingled with early diagnosis and the miltefosine medication has been attributed with her survival. On the other hand, the other survivor, an 8-year-old male, was diagnosed several days after symptoms appeared and was not treated with targeted temperature management; however, he was administered the miltefosine. He suffered what is likely permanent neurological damage.

In 2016, a 16-year-old boy also survived PAM. He was treated with the same protocols of the 12-year-old girl in 2013. He recovered making a near complete neurological recovery; however, he has stated that learning has been more difficult for him since contracting the disease.

In 2018, a 10-year-old girl in the Spanish city of Toledo became the first person to have PAM in Spain, and was successfully treated using intravenous and intrathecal amphotericin B.

A 2023 study has discovered that the treatment (with usage of benzoxaboroles) of infected mice significantly prolonged survival and showed a 28% cure rate without relapse.

Prognosis

Since its first description in the 1960s, only seven people worldwide have been reported to have survived PAM out of 450 cases diagnosed, implying a fatality rate of about 98.5%. The survivors include four in the United States, one in Mexico and one in Spain. One of the US survivors had brain damage that is likely permanent, but there are two documented surviving cases in the United States who made a full recovery with no neurological damage; they were both treated with the same protocols.

Epidemiology
The disease is rare and highly lethal: there had only been 300 cases as of 2008. Drug treatment research at Aga Khan University in Pakistan has shown that in vitro drug susceptibility tests with some FDA approved drugs used for non-infectious diseases (digoxin and procyclidine were shown to be most effective of the drugs studied) have proved to kill Naegleria fowleri with an amoebicidal rate greater than 95%. The same source has also proposed a device for drug delivery via the transcranial route to the brain.

In the US, the most common states with cases reported of PAM from N. fowleri are the southern states, with Texas and Florida having the highest prevalence. The most commonly affected age group is 5–14-year olds (those who play in water). The number of cases of infection could increase due to climate change, which was posited as the reason for three cases in Minnesota in 2010, 2012, and 2015.

As of 2013, the numbers of reported cases were expected to increase simply because of better-informed diagnoses being made both in ongoing cases and in autopsy findings.

History
In 1899, Franz Schardinger first discovered and documented an amoeba he called Amoeba gruberi that could transform into a flagellate. The genus Naegleria was established by Alexis Alexeieff in 1912, who grouped the flagellate amoeba. He coined the term Naegleria after Kurt Nägler, who researched amoebae. It was not until 1965 that doctors Malcolm Fowler and Rodney F. Carter in Adelaide, Australia, reported the first four human cases of amoebic meningoencephalitis. These cases involved four Australian children, one in 1961 and the rest in 1965, all of whom had succumbed to the illness. Their work on amebo-flagellates has provided an example of how a protozoan can effectively live both freely in the environment, and in a human host.

In 1966, Fowler termed the infection resulting from N. fowleri primary amoebic meningoencephalitis (PAM) to distinguish this central nervous system (CNS) invasion from other secondary invasions made by other amoebae such as Entamoeba histolytica. A retrospective study determined the first documented case of PAM possibly occurred in Britain in 1909. In 1966, four cases were reported in the US. By 1968 the causative organism, previously thought to be a species of Acanthamoeba or Hartmannella, was identified as Naegleria. This same year, occurrence of sixteen cases over a period of three years (1962–1965) was reported in Ústí nad Labem, Czechoslovakia. In 1970, Carter named the species of amoeba N. fowleri, after Malcolm Fowler.

Society and culture 
Naegleria fowleri is also known as the "brain-eating amoeba". The term has also been applied to Balamuthia mandrillaris, causing some confusion between the two; Balamuthia mandrillaris is unrelated to Naegleria fowleri, and causes a different disease called granulomatous amoebic encephalitis. Unlike naegleriasis, which is usually seen in people with normal immune function, granulomatous amoebic encephalitis is usually seen in people with poor immune function, such as those with HIV/AIDS or leukemia.

Naegleriasis was the topic of episodes 20 and 21 in Season 2 of the medical mystery drama House, M.D. It is also the topic of the episode "39 Differences" of season 6 of The Good Doctor.

Research 
The U.S. National Institutes of Health budgeted $800,000 for research on the disease in 2016. Phenothiazines have been tested in vitro and in animal models of PAM. Improving case detection through increased awareness, reporting, and information about cases might enable earlier detection of infections, provide insight into the human or environmental determinants of infection, and allow improved assessment of treatment effectiveness.

See also 
 Balamuthia mandrillaris – unrelated pathogenic organism that shares the same common name as N. fowleri

References

External links 
 Naegleria Infection Information Page from the Centers for Disease Control and Prevention
 Naegleria General Information from the website of the Centers for Disease Control and Prevention
 Articles about Naegleriasis in Google Scholar

Parasitic excavates
Percolozoa
Waterborne diseases
Rare infectious diseases
Neglected American diseases